Meine Oma fährt im Hühnerstall Motorrad ("My Grandma Drives Her Motorcycle In The Chicken Coop") is a German humouristic song. It dates back to the 1930s, probably stemming from two older works: the refrain of the Rheinländer dance Wir versaufen unsrer Oma ihr klein Häuschen, authored by Robert Steidl in 1922, constitutes most of the melody, while the text is a variation of the Foxtrott Meine Oma fährt Motorrad, ohne Bremse, ohne Licht ("my grand-mother rides a motorcycle without brakes nor lighting"), a 1928 work with words by Ernst Albert and music by Erwin Bolt.

Origins and variants 
The Deutsches Volksliedarchiv (German archives of popular songs) have conducted extensive research into the origin of the song. They describe it as "an instance of absurd humour, as well as a typical example of the songs that developed in parallel to the media musical culture of the 20th century, constantly mutating under their own dynamic."  When exactly the two works mixed is not known. The earliest known instance is an incipit in a magazine containing the words of the song in 1935 or 1936. The earliest document held by the Deutschen Volksliedarchiv dates from 1942.

1958 version 
In 1958, Meine Oma fährt im Hühnerstall Motorrad was printed for the first time in a songbook, Der Zündschlüssel, by the Fidula-Verlag printing company, from the recollection of editor Johannes Holzmeister.

1980 version 
In 1980, Fredrik Vahle published a 25-stanza version in Liederspatz, where the grandma sits behind the wheel, watches the TV series Tagesschau, and goes to the disco.

2019 WDR parody 
In 2019, Westdeutscher Rundfunk Köln (WDR) had a new version sung by the children choir of the Choral Academy of Dortmund, authored by one of the hosts of WDR-2 as a caricature of intergenerational tensions. The new version appeared on 27 December 2019 on an online video. The file was removed shortly thereafter, following criticism of the refrain that states "My grand-mother is an old environmental pig" (in original German: Meine Oma ist 'ne alte Umweltsau). However, the video remains available from YouTube. The next day, in a special broadcast on WDR, Tom Buhrow and the head of programmes Jochen Rausch apologised without reserve for the video, which he called a "mistake". The choir director,  Zeljo Davutovic, issued a statement praising the youth movement Fridays for Future, commenting "this is not about grand-mothers, this is about all of us".

On 29 December, Right-Wing groups started demonstrating in front of the WDR headquarters in protest of the song. Counter-protests by Left-Wing groups soon followed, as well as a police presence. In total, around 100 people were involved.

Notes

References

External links 

 
 Xaver Frühbeis: Ohne Bremse, ohne Licht: "Meine Oma fährt im Hühnerstall Motorrad". BR-Klassik Mittagsmusik extra, 31 December 2010, retrieved 17 June 2018

German folk songs
German children's songs
Schlager songs
Volkslied